Johnny Rodriguez was the manager for the Springfield Cardinals, a minor league baseball team, based in Springfield, Missouri. The Cardinals play in the Texas league (minor league) and are double-A affiliates of the St. Louis Cardinals (major league club).

References

Living people
Minor league baseball managers
Year of birth missing (living people)